Gynacantha chaplini is a species of dragonfly described from North-eastern Bangladesh.

Range
Bangladesh

Etymology
The species is named in honor of the famous British actor and director, Sir Charles Spencer "Charlie" Chaplin (masculine noun, singular in the genitive case). The trapezium-shaped marking of the postfrons of the new species resembles Chaplin’s iconic toothbrush moustache.

References

Aeshnidae
Odonata of Asia
Insects of Bangladesh
Insects described in 2021